The Sunday Daddy is a 1985 Soviet drama film directed by Naum Birman.

Plot 
The film tells about a boy whose parents divorced. And now he can see his father only on Sundays, but he does everything he can to keep his parents together again.

Cast 
 Dmitriy Grankin
 Yuriy Duvanov
 Tamara Akulova
 Galina Polskikh
 Boris Shcherbakov
 Vera Glagoleva
 Anna Nakhapetova
 Mikhail Kokshenov	
 Anton Granat

References

External links 
 

1985 films
1980s Russian-language films
Soviet drama films
1985 drama films